David Tilden Altizer (November 6, 1876 – May 14, 1964) was a Major League Baseball shortstop who played six seasons for the Washington Senators, Cleveland Naps, Chicago White Sox, and Cincinnati Reds of Major League Baseball. 

Altizer served in the military in the early 20th century, and he did not appear in professional baseball until he was 25. He spent four seasons playing mostly in the Connecticut State League before he debuted in the major leagues  with the 1906 Washington Senators. On July 23, 1908, the Cleveland Naps of the American League purchased Altizer and Cy Falkenberg from the Senators for $10,000 ($ in current dollar terms).

Altizer's youngest brother, Oren, was killed in military action in France in 1918. Newspaper reports initially mischaracterized Oren as Altizer's son, but Altizer's only son was a school-aged child at the time.  

In 514 games over six seasons, Altizer posted a .250 batting average (433-for-1734) with 204 runs, 4 home runs, 116 RBIs, and 119 stolen bases. He finished his career with a .952 fielding percentage playing at all positions except catcher and pitcher.

He died in Pleasant Hill, Illinois, at the age of 87.

References

External links

1876 births
1964 deaths
Baseball players from Illinois
Major League Baseball shortstops
Major League Baseball outfielders
Major League Baseball first basemen
Washington Senators (1901–1960) players
Cleveland Naps players
Chicago White Sox players
Cincinnati Reds players
People from Pike County, Illinois
Minor league baseball managers
Meriden Silverites players
Buffalo Bisons (minor league) players
Toledo Mud Hens players
Springfield Ponies players
Lancaster Red Roses players
Minneapolis Millers (baseball) players
Madison Greys players